A traditional hunter-gatherer or forager is a human living an ancestrally derived lifestyle in which most or all food is obtained by foraging, that is, by gathering food from local sources, especially edible wild plants but also insects, fungi, honey, or anything safe to eat, and/or by hunting game (pursuing and/or trapping and killing wild animals, including catching fish), roughly as most animal omnivores do. Hunter-gatherer societies stand in contrast to the more sedentary agricultural societies, which rely mainly on cultivating crops and raising domesticated animals for food production, although the boundaries between the two ways of living are not completely distinct.

Hunting and gathering was humanity's original and most enduring successful competitive adaptation in the natural world, occupying at least 90 percent of human history. Following the invention of agriculture, hunter-gatherers who did not change were displaced or conquered by farming or pastoralist groups in most parts of the world.

Only a few contemporary societies of uncontacted people are still classified as hunter-gatherers, and many supplement their foraging activity with horticulture or pastoralism.

Archaeological evidence

Hunting and gathering was presumably the subsistence strategy employed by human societies beginning some 1.8 million years ago, by Homo erectus, and from its appearance some 200,000 years ago by Homo sapiens. Prehistoric hunter-gatherers lived in groups that consisted of several families resulting in a size of a few dozen people. It remained the only mode of subsistence until the end of the Mesolithic period some 10,000 years ago, and after this was replaced only gradually with the spread of the Neolithic Revolution.

During the 1970s, Lewis Binford suggested that early humans obtained food via scavenging, not hunting. Early humans in the Lower Paleolithic lived in forests and woodlands, which allowed them to collect seafood, eggs, nuts, and fruits besides scavenging. Rather than killing large animals for meat, according to this view, they used carcasses of such animals that had either been killed by predators or that had died of natural causes. Scientists have demonstrated that the evidence for early human behaviors for hunting versus carcass scavenging vary based on the ecology, including the types of predators that existed and the environment. Archaeological and genetic data suggest that the source populations of Paleolithic hunter-gatherers survived in sparsely wooded areas and dispersed through areas of high primary productivity while avoiding dense forest cover.

According to the endurance running hypothesis, long-distance running as in persistence hunting, a method still practiced by some hunter-gatherer groups in modern times, was likely the driving evolutionary force leading to the evolution of certain human characteristics. This hypothesis does not necessarily contradict the scavenging hypothesis: both subsistence strategies may have been in use sequentially, alternately or even simultaneously.

Starting at the transition between the Middle to Upper Paleolithic period, some 80,000 to 70,000 years ago, some hunter-gatherer bands began to specialize, concentrating on hunting a smaller selection of (often larger) game and gathering a smaller selection of food. This specialization of work also involved creating specialized tools such as fishing nets, hooks, and bone harpoons. The transition into the subsequent Neolithic period is chiefly defined by the unprecedented development of nascent agricultural practices. Agriculture originated as early as 12,000 years ago in the Middle East, and also independently originated in many other areas including Southeast Asia, parts of Africa, Mesoamerica, and the Andes.

Forest gardening was also being used as a food production system in various parts of the world over this period. Forest gardens had originated in prehistoric times along jungle-clad river banks and in the wet foothills of monsoon regions. In the gradual process of families improving their immediate environment, useful tree and vine species were identified, protected, and improved, whilst undesirable species were eliminated. Eventually superior introduced species were selected and incorporated into the gardens.

Many groups continued their hunter-gatherer ways of life, although their numbers have continually declined, partly as a result of pressure from growing agricultural and pastoral communities. Many of them reside in the developing world, either in arid regions or tropical forests. Areas that were formerly available to hunter-gatherers were—and continue to be—encroached upon by the settlements of agriculturalists. In the resulting competition for land use, hunter-gatherer societies either adopted these practices or moved to other areas. In addition, Jared Diamond has blamed a decline in the availability of wild foods, particularly animal resources. In North and South America, for example, most large mammal species had gone extinct by the end of the Pleistocene—according to Diamond, because of overexploitation by humans, one of several explanations offered for the Quaternary extinction event there.

As the number and size of agricultural societies increased, they expanded into lands traditionally used by hunter-gatherers. This process of agriculture-driven expansion led to the development of the first forms of government in agricultural centers, such as the Fertile Crescent, Ancient India, Ancient China, Olmec, Sub-Saharan Africa and Norte Chico.

As a result of the now near-universal human reliance upon agriculture, the few contemporary hunter-gatherer cultures usually live in areas unsuitable for agricultural use.

Archaeologists can use evidence such as stone tool use to track hunter-gatherer activities, including mobility.

Ethnobotany is the field of study whereby food plants of various peoples and tribes worldwide are documented.

Common characteristics

Habitat and population
Most hunter-gatherers are nomadic or semi-nomadic and live in temporary settlements. Mobile communities typically construct shelters using impermanent building materials, or they may use natural rock shelters, where they are available.

Some hunter-gatherer cultures, such as the indigenous peoples of the Pacific Northwest Coast and the Yokuts, lived in particularly rich environments that allowed them to be sedentary or semi-sedentary. Amongst the earliest example of permanent settlements is the Osipovka culture (14–10.3 thousand years ago), which lived in a fish-rich environment that allowed them to be able to stay at the same place all year. One group, the Chumash, had the highest recorded population density of any known hunter and gatherer society with an estimated 21.6 persons per square mile.

Social and economic structure
Hunter-gatherers tend to have an egalitarian social ethos, although settled hunter-gatherers (for example, those inhabiting the Northwest Coast of North America) are an exception to this rule. For example, the San people or "Bushmen" of southern Africa have social customs that strongly discourage hoarding and displays of authority, and encourage economic equality via sharing of food and material goods. Karl Marx defined this socio-economic system as primitive communism.

The egalitarianism typical of human hunters and gatherers is never total, but is striking when viewed in an evolutionary context. One of humanity's two closest primate relatives, chimpanzees, are anything but egalitarian, forming themselves into hierarchies that are often dominated by an alpha male. So great is the contrast with human hunter-gatherers that it is widely argued by paleoanthropologists that resistance to being dominated was a key factor driving the evolutionary emergence of human consciousness, language, kinship and social organization.

Most anthropologists believe that hunter-gatherers do not have permanent leaders; instead, the person taking the initiative at any one time depends on the task being performed.

Within a particular tribe or people, hunter-gatherers are connected by both kinship and band (residence/domestic group) membership. Postmarital residence among hunter-gatherers tends to be matrilocal, at least initially. Young mothers can enjoy childcare support from their own mothers, who continue living nearby in the same camp. The systems of kinship and descent among human hunter-gatherers were relatively flexible, although there is evidence that early human kinship in general tended to be matrilineal.

The conventional assumption has been that women did most of the gathering, while men concentrated on big game hunting. An illustrative account is Megan Biesele's study of the southern African Ju/'hoan, 'Women Like Meat'. A recent study suggests that the sexual division of labor was the fundamental organizational innovation that gave Homo sapiens the edge over the Neanderthals, allowing our ancestors to migrate from Africa and spread across the globe.

A 1986 study found most hunter-gatherers have a symbolically structured sexual division of labor. However, it is true that in a small minority of cases, women hunted the same kind of quarry as men, sometimes doing so alongside men. Among the Ju'/hoansi people of Namibia, women help men track down quarry. In the Australian Martu, both women and men participate in hunting but with a different style of gendered division; while men are willing to take more risks to hunt bigger animals such as kangaroo for political gain as a form of "competitive magnanimity", women target smaller game such as lizards to feed their children and promote working relationships with other women, preferring a more constant supply of sustenance.

9000-year-old remains of a female hunter along with a toolkit of projectile points and animal processing implements were discovered at the Andean site of Wilamaya Patjxa, Puno District in Peru.

At the 1966 "Man the Hunter" conference, anthropologists Richard Borshay Lee and Irven DeVore suggested that egalitarianism was one of several central characteristics of nomadic hunting and gathering societies because mobility requires minimization of material possessions throughout a population. Therefore, no surplus of resources can be accumulated by any single member. Other characteristics Lee and DeVore proposed were flux in territorial boundaries as well as in demographic composition.

At the same conference, Marshall Sahlins presented a paper entitled, "Notes on the Original Affluent Society", in which he challenged the popular view of hunter-gatherers lives as "solitary, poor, nasty, brutish and short", as Thomas Hobbes had put it in 1651.
According to Sahlins, ethnographic data indicated that hunter-gatherers worked far fewer hours and enjoyed more leisure than typical members of industrial society, and they still ate well. Their "affluence" came from the idea that they were satisfied with very little in the material sense. Later, in 1996, Ross Sackett performed two distinct meta-analyses to empirically test Sahlin's view. The first of these studies looked at 102 time-allocation studies, and the second one analyzed 207 energy-expenditure studies. Sackett found that adults in foraging and horticultural societies work, on average, about 6.5 hours a day, whereas people in agricultural and industrial societies work on average 8.8 hours a day.

Researchers Gurven and Kaplan have estimated that around 57% of hunter-gatherers reach the age of 15. Of those that reach 15 years of age, 64% continue to live to or past the age of 45. This places the life expectancy between 21 and 37 years. They further estimate that 70% of deaths are due to diseases of some kind, 20% of deaths come from violence or accidents and 10% are due to degenerative diseases.

Mutual exchange and sharing of resources (i.e., meat gained from hunting) are important in the economic systems of hunter-gatherer societies. Therefore, these societies can be described as based on a "gift economy."

A 2010 paper argued that while hunter-gatherers may have lower levels of inequality than modern, industrialised societies, that does not mean inequality does not exist. The researchers estimated that the average Gini coefficient amongst hunter-gatherers was 0.25, equivalent to the country of Denmark in 2007. In addition, wealth transmission across generations was also a feature of hunter-gatherers, meaning that "wealthy" hunter-gatherers, within the context of their communities, were more likely to have children as wealthy as them than poorer members of their community and indeed hunter-gatherer societies demonstrate an understanding of social stratification. Thus while the researchers agreed that hunter-gatherers were more egalitarian than modern societies, prior characterisations of them living in a state of egalitarian primitive communism were inaccurate and misleading.

This study, however, exclusively examined modern hunter-gatherer communities, offering limited insight into the exact nature of social structures that existed prior to the Neolithic Revolution. Alain Testart and others have said that anthropologists should be careful when using research on current hunter-gatherer societies to determine the structure of societies in the paleolithic era, emphasising cross-cultural influences, progress and development that such societies have undergone in the past 10,000 years. As such, the combined anthropological and archaeological evidence to date continues to favour previous understandings of early hunter-gatherers as largely egalitarian.

Diet
As one moves away from the equator, the importance of plant food decreases and the importance of aquatic food increases. In cold and heavily forested environments, edible plant foods and large game are less abundant and hunter-gatherers may turn to aquatic resources to compensate. Hunter-gatherers in cold climates also rely more on stored food than those in warm climates. However, aquatic resources tend to be costly, requiring boats and fishing technology, and this may have impeded their intensive use in prehistory. Marine food probably did not start becoming prominent in the diet until relatively recently, during the Late Stone Age in southern Africa and the Upper Paleolithic in Europe.

Fat is important in assessing the quality of game among hunter-gatherers, to the point that lean animals are often considered secondary resources or even starvation food. Consuming too much lean meat leads to adverse health effects like protein poisoning, and can in extreme cases lead to death. Additionally, a diet high in protein and low in other macronutrients results in the body using the protein as energy, possibly leading to protein deficiency. Lean meat especially becomes a problem when animals go through a lean season that requires them to metabolize fat deposits.

In areas where plant and fish resources are scarce, hunter-gatherers may trade meat with horticulturalists for carbohydrates. For example, tropical hunter-gatherers may have an excess of protein but be deficient in carbohydrates, and conversely tropical horticulturalists may have a surplus of carbohydrates but inadequate protein. Trading may thus be the most cost-effective means of acquiring carbohydrate resources.

Variability

Hunter-gatherer societies manifest significant variability, depending on climate zone/life zone, available technology, and societal structure. Archaeologists examine hunter-gatherer tool kits to measure variability across different groups. Collard et al. (2005) found temperature to be the only statistically significant factor to impact hunter-gatherer tool kits. Using temperature as a proxy for risk, Collard et al.'s results suggest that environments with extreme temperatures pose a threat to hunter-gatherer systems significant enough to warrant increased variability of tools. These results support Torrence's (1989) theory that the risk of failure is indeed the most important factor in determining the structure of hunter-gatherer toolkits.

One way to divide hunter-gatherer groups is by their return systems.
James Woodburn uses the categories "immediate return" hunter-gatherers for egalitarianism and "delayed return" for nonegalitarian.
Immediate return foragers consume their food within a day or two after they procure it.
Delayed return foragers store the surplus food.

Hunting-gathering was the common human mode of subsistence throughout the Paleolithic, but the observation of current-day hunters and gatherers does not necessarily reflect Paleolithic societies; the hunter-gatherer cultures examined today have had much contact with modern civilization and do not represent "pristine" conditions found in uncontacted peoples.

The transition from hunting and gathering to agriculture is not necessarily a one-way process.
It has been argued that hunting and gathering represents an adaptive strategy, which may still be exploited, if necessary, when environmental change causes extreme food stress for agriculturalists. In fact, it is sometimes difficult to draw a clear line between agricultural and hunter-gatherer societies, especially since the widespread adoption of agriculture and resulting cultural diffusion that has occurred in the last 10,000 years.

Nowadays, some scholars speak about the existence within cultural evolution of the so-called mixed-economies or dual economies which imply a combination of food procurement (gathering and hunting) and food production or when foragers have trade relations with farmers.

Modern and revisionist perspectives

Some of the theorists who advocate this "revisionist" critique imply that, because the "pure hunter-gatherer" disappeared not long after colonial (or even agricultural) contact began, nothing meaningful can be learned about prehistoric hunter-gatherers from studies of modern ones (Kelly, 24–29; see Wilmsen)

Lee and Guenther have rejected most of the arguments put forward by Wilmsen. Doron Shultziner and others have argued that we can learn a lot about the life-styles of prehistoric hunter-gatherers from studies of contemporary hunter-gatherers—especially their impressive levels of egalitarianism.

There are nevertheless a number of contemporary hunter-gatherer peoples who, after contact with other societies, continue their ways of life with very little external influence or with modifications that perpetuate the viability of hunting and gathering in the 21st century. One such group is the Pila Nguru (Spinifex people) of Western Australia, whose habitat in the Great Victoria Desert has proved unsuitable for European agriculture (and even pastoralism). Another are the Sentinelese of the Andaman Islands in the Indian Ocean, who live on North Sentinel Island and to date have maintained their independent existence, repelling attempts to engage with and contact them. The Savanna Pumé of Venezuela also live in an area that is inhospitable to large scale economic exploitation and maintain their subsistence based on hunting and gathering, as well as incorporating a small amount of manioc horticulture that supplements, but is not replacing, reliance on foraged foods.

Americas

Evidence suggests big-game hunter-gatherers crossed the Bering Strait from Asia (Eurasia) into North America over a land bridge (Beringia), that existed between 47,000 and 14,000 years ago. Around 18,500–15,500 years ago, these hunter-gatherers are believed to have followed herds of now-extinct Pleistocene megafauna along ice-free corridors that stretched between the Laurentide and Cordilleran ice sheets. Another route proposed is that, either on foot or using primitive boats, they migrated down the Pacific coast to South America.

Hunter-gatherers would eventually flourish all over the Americas, primarily based in the Great Plains of the United States and Canada, with offshoots as far east as the Gaspé Peninsula on the Atlantic coast, and as far south as Chile, Monte Verde. American hunter-gatherers were spread over a wide geographical area, thus there were regional variations in lifestyles. However, all the individual groups shared a common style of stone tool production, making knapping styles and progress identifiable. This early Paleo-Indian period lithic reduction tool adaptations have been found across the Americas, utilized by highly mobile bands consisting of approximately 25 to 50 members of an extended family.

The Archaic period in the Americas saw a changing environment featuring a warmer more arid climate and the disappearance of the last megafauna. The majority of population groups at this time were still highly mobile hunter-gatherers. Individual groups started to focus on resources available to them locally, however, and thus archaeologists have identified a pattern of increasing regional generalization, as seen with the Southwest, Arctic, Poverty Point, Dalton and Plano traditions. These regional adaptations would become the norm, with reliance less on hunting and gathering, with a more mixed economy of small game, fish, seasonally wild vegetables and harvested plant foods.

Scholars like Kat Anderson have suggested that the term Hunter-gatherer is reductive because it implies that Native Americans never stayed in one place long enough to affect the environment around them. However, many of the landscapes in the Americas today are due to the way the Natives of that area originally tended the land. Anderson specifically looks at California Natives and the practices they utilized to tame their land. Some of these practices included pruning, weeding, sowing, burning, and selective harvesting. These practices allowed them to take from the environment in a sustainable manner for centuries.

California Indians view the idea of wilderness in a negative light. They believe that wilderness is the result of humans losing their knowledge of the natural world and how to care for it. When the earth turns back to wilderness after the connection with humans is lost then the plants and animals will retreat and hide from the humans.

See also

 Beachcombing
 Nomads
 Cro-Magnon
 Homo floresiensis
 Human migration
 Human history
 Indigenous peoples
 Neanderthals
 Neolithic Revolution
 Origins of society
 Paleolithic
 Prehistoric music
 Primitive skills
 Stateless society
 Tribe
 Clan
 Caucasian Hunter-Gatherer
 Pitted Ware culture

Modern hunter-gatherer groups

 Aeta people
 Aka people
 Andamanese people
 Angu people
 Awá-Guajá people
 Batek people
 Efé people
 Fuegians
 Hadza people
 Indigenous peoples of the Pacific Northwest Coast
 Inuit
 Iñupiat
 Jarawa people (Andaman Islands)
 Kawahiva people
 Maniq people
 Mbuti people
 Mlabri people
 Moriori people
 Nukak people
 Onge people
 Penan people
 Pirahã people
 Raute people
 San people
 Semang people
 Sentinelese people
 Tjimba people
 Yaruro (Pumé) people
 Ye'kuana people
 Yupik people

Social movements
 Anarcho-primitivism, which strives for the abolishment of civilization and the return to a life in the wild.
 Freeganism involves gathering of food (and sometimes other materials) in the context of an urban or suburban environment.
 Gleaning involves the gathering of food that traditional farmers have left behind in their fields.
 Paleolithic diet, which strives to achieve a diet similar to that of ancient hunter-gatherer groups.

References

Further reading

Books
 
 
  (Reviewed in The Montreal Review)
 
 
 
 
 
 
 

Articles

External links

 International Society for Hunter Gatherer Research (ISHGR)
 History of the Conference on Hunting and Gathering Societies (CHAGS)
 The Association of Foragers: An international association for teachers of hunter-gatherer skills.
 A wiki dedicated to the scientific study of the diversity of foraging societies without recreating myths
 

Anthropological categories of peoples
Nomads
Stone Age
 
Human evolution
Economic systems
Foraging